Covenant University Secondary School is a Nigerian Christian secondary school located within the Covenant University campus in Ota, Ogun State. It was established on 14 October 2010, primarily to cater for the educational needs of the children of academic and non-academic staff of the school.

See also

 Christianity in Nigeria
 Education in Nigeria
 List of schools in Nigeria

References

External links
 , the school's official website

2010 establishments in Nigeria
Christian schools in Nigeria
Covenant University
Educational institutions established in 2010
Secondary schools in Ogun State